Žiga Mlakar (born 16 May 1990) is a Slovenian handball player who plays for RK Celje and the Slovenian national team.

He represented Slovenia at the 2018 European Men's Handball Championship.

References

1990 births
Living people
Sportspeople from Celje
Slovenian male handball players
Expatriate handball players
Expatriate handball players in Poland
Slovenian expatriate sportspeople in Poland
Slovenian expatriate sportspeople in Croatia
Wisła Płock (handball) players